There have been 40 United States presidential visits to Canada by 13 presidents over the past century. As the U.S. president is both head of state and head of government, these visits have taken many forms, ranging from formal state visits, to official visits, working visits, or private visits (or, as in the case of Franklin D. Roosevelt, personal vacations).

Since the first presidential visit, made by Warren G. Harding in 1923 (just a few weeks before his death), Canada has become one of the most common presidential international travel destinations. Since the Franklin Roosevelt Administration, only Gerald Ford and Jimmy Carter never visited Canada while in office. Seven presidents have addressed a joint session of the Canadian parliament, with Dwight D. Eisenhower and Ronald Reagan both speaking twice.

Table of visits

Dominion of Newfoundland
Prior to becoming a Canadian province in 1949, Newfoundland was a separate British dominion. President Franklin Roosevelt visited there twice. He vacationed at Bay of Islands and Bonne Bay on August 17–20, 1939. Two years later, August 9–12, 1941, he returned to Newfoundland, ostensibly for another vacation. In actuality, he conferred with British Prime Minister Winston Churchill aboard ship (HMS Prince of Wales and USS Augusta) in Placentia Bay. At the conclusion of the conference they issued the Atlantic Charter.

See also
 Canada–United States relations
 Foreign policy of the United States
 Foreign relations of the United States

References

Canada–United States relations
Lists of United States presidential visits